An imaginary number is a real number multiplied by the imaginary unit , which is defined by its property . By definition, zero is considered to be both real and imaginary.

Originally coined in the 17th century by René Descartes as a derogatory term and regarded as fictitious or useless, the concept gained wide acceptance following the work of Leonhard Euler (in the 18th century) and Augustin-Louis Cauchy and Carl Friedrich Gauss (in the early 19th century).

History

Although the Greek mathematician and engineer Hero of Alexandria is noted as the first to present a calculation involving the square root of a negative number, it was Rafael Bombelli who first set down the rules for multiplication of complex numbers in 1572. The concept had appeared in print earlier, such as in work by Gerolamo Cardano. At the time, imaginary numbers and negative numbers were poorly understood and were regarded by some as fictitious or useless, much as zero once was. Many other mathematicians were slow to adopt the use of imaginary numbers, including René Descartes, who wrote about them in his La Géométrie in which he coined the term imaginary and meant it to be derogatory. The use of imaginary numbers was not widely accepted until the work of Leonhard Euler (1707–1783) and Carl Friedrich Gauss (1777–1855). The geometric significance of complex numbers as points in a plane was first described by Caspar Wessel (1745–1818).

In 1843, William Rowan Hamilton extended the idea of an axis of imaginary numbers in the plane to a four-dimensional space of quaternion imaginaries in which three of the dimensions are analogous to the imaginary numbers in the complex field.

Geometric interpretation

Geometrically, imaginary numbers are found on the vertical axis of the complex number plane, which allows them to be presented perpendicular to the real axis. One way of viewing imaginary numbers is to consider a standard number line positively increasing in magnitude to the right and negatively increasing in magnitude to the left. At 0 on the -axis, a -axis can be drawn with "positive" direction going up; "positive" imaginary numbers then increase in magnitude upwards, and "negative" imaginary numbers increase in magnitude downwards.

In this representation, multiplication by  corresponds to a rotation of 180 degrees about the origin, which is a half circle. Multiplication by  corresponds to a rotation of 90 degrees about the origin which is a quarter of a circle. Both these numbers are roots of : , . In the field of complex numbers, for every ,  has nth roots , meaning , called roots of unity. Multiplying by the first th root of unity causes a rotation of  degrees about the origin.

Multiplying by a complex number is the same as rotating around the origin by the complex number's argument, followed by a scaling by its magnitude.

Square roots of negative numbers
Care must be used when working with imaginary numbers that are expressed as the principal values of the square roots of negative numbers:
 
That is sometimes written as:

The fallacy occurs as the equality  fails when the variables are not suitably constrained. In that case, the equality fails to hold as the numbers are both negative, which can be demonstrated by: 

See also
 Octonion
 −1

Notes

References

Bibliography
 , explains many applications of imaginary expressions.

External links

 How can one show that imaginary numbers really do exist? – an article that discusses the existence of imaginary numbers.
 5Numbers programme 4 BBC Radio 4 programme
 Why Use Imaginary Numbers? Basic Explanation and Uses of Imaginary Numbers